Francisco Segundo Valdés Muñoz, (19 March 1943 - 10 August 2009), nicknamed Chamaco, was a Chilean footballer and manager. Recognized as one of Chile's most important midfielders, with 215 official goals, he is the top scorer in the history of Chilean league.

Career
Valdés always played in the Chilean first division league, where he became the top scorer in their history with 215 goals in 478 official matches, leaving behind Pedro "Heidi" Gonzalez with 212 goals. He is the maximum gunner for Colo Colo in official tournaments with 180 goals scored (179 in 353 matches during the Chilean national championship and 1 goal during the liguilla Copa Libertadores) and the top scorer in Copa Libertadores with 20 goals in 44 matches.

He was the brains, and alongside Carlos Caszely, the star of Colo Colo 1973, and the champion in 1963 and 1972. He was also runner-up on the Copa Libertadores de America in 1973.

Selected by the Chile national team, he played 50 matches, scoring 9 goals. He was the Chile offensive midfielder in the England 1966 and Germany 1974 FIFA World Cups. In 1973, he was runner-up of the Copa Libertadores with Colo Colo, he was also the captain of the Chile national team.

Personal life

He was the uncle of Chilean footballer Sebastián "Chamagol" González.

He died of heart failure at his home at the age of 66.

Honours
Colo Colo
 Primera División de Chile: 1963, 1972
 Copa Chile: 1974

References

External links

FIFA statistics

1943 births
2009 deaths
Footballers from Santiago
Chilean footballers
Chile international footballers
1966 FIFA World Cup players
1974 FIFA World Cup players
1975 Copa América players
Colo-Colo footballers
Unión Española footballers
C.D. Antofagasta footballers
Santiago Wanderers footballers
Cobreloa footballers
San Marcos de Arica footballers
Chilean Primera División players
Chilean football managers
San Luis de Quillota managers
Coquimbo Unido managers
Lota Schwager managers
Deportes Puerto Montt managers
Rangers de Talca managers
Magallanes managers
Primera B de Chile managers
Association football midfielders